Jesper Nyberg (born 11 May 1994) is a Swedish sport shooter.

He participated at the 2018 ISSF World Shooting Championships, winning a medal.

References

External links

Living people
1994 births
Swedish male sport shooters
Running target shooters
21st-century Swedish people